Toyloq District is a district of Samarqand Region in Uzbekistan. The capital lies at the town Toyloq.

The district consists of 3 urban-type settlements (Toyloq, Adas, Bogʻizagʻon) and 9 rural communities.

References 

Samarqand Region
Districts of Uzbekistan